Brazdauskis is the masculine form of a Lithuanian family name. Notable people with the surname include:

Lukas Brazdauskis (born 1988), Lithuanian basketball player
Romanas Brazdauskis (born 1964), Lithuanian basketball player, father of Lukas

Lithuanian-language surnames